Notoglanidium akiri is a species of claroteid catfish endemic to Nigeria where it occurs in the Niger Delta and the New Calabar and Bonny Rivers. It reaches a length of 10.7 cm (4.2 inches) SL.

References 

Endemic fauna of Nigeria
Claroteidae
Fish of Africa
Fish described in 1987